Jolgeh Rokh District is a district (bakhsh) in Torbat-e Heydarieh County, Razavi Khorasan Province, Iran. At the 2006 census, its population was 24,886, in 6,162 families.  The district has one city: Robat-e Sang. The district has three rural districts (dehestan): Bala Rokh Rural District, Mian Rokh Rural District, and Pain Rokh Rural District.

References 

Districts of Razavi Khorasan Province
Torbat-e Heydarieh County